Zero wait state is a feature of a  processor  or  computer  architecture in which the processor does not have to wait to perform  memory  access. 

Non-zero wait state describes the situation when a processor operates at a higher frequency than the memory, it has a wait state during which the processor is idle.

Computer memory